Su-ngai Padi is a district (amphoe) in Narathiwat province, Thailand.

Geography
Neighboring districts are (from the north clockwise): Cho-airong, Tak Bai, Su-ngai Kolok, Waeng, Sukhirin, and Ra-ngae.

Administration
The district is divided into six sub-districts (tambons), which are further subdivided into 50 villages (mubans). Paluru is a township (thesaban tambon) which covers parts of the tambon Paluru. There are a further six tambon administrative organizations (TAO).

External links
amphoe.com

Districts of Narathiwat province